Payday 3 (stylised as PAYDAY 3) is an upcoming first-person shooter game developed by Overkill Software and Starbreeze Studios and published by Prime Matter, as a sequel to Payday 2 from the same series. The game is set to be released in 2023.

Setting 
The game will take place after the ending of Payday 2 where the heisters went separate ways and left their lives of crime, but something re-motivates the Payday Gang to continue the life of crime. The original crew of characters originating from Payday: The Heist ("Dallas", "Chains", "Wolf", and "Hoxton") will appear in Payday 3, and the game will take place mainly in New York. From teaser images, one of the missions will take place at the "Gold & Sharke Incorporated" bank. Payday 3 will take place in the 2020s, intended to add more depth to the Payday Gang's crimes with game-changing differences like more advanced surveillance or the rise of cryptocurrency.

Development 
In March 2021, Koch Media committed to pay  to assist in the game's development and marketing, including more than 18 months of post-launch support using the games as a service model. Payday 3 will be developed using Unreal Engine. The game is planned to release in 2023. On January 1st, a teaser trailer titled A New Criminal Dawn was released, revealing its logo. Console versions also will be the same version as the game is on PC platforms, unlike its predecessor. Overkill states that this is due to the game being created using the Unreal Engine.

References

External links
  

Upcoming video games scheduled for 2023
Bank robbery in fiction
Cooperative video games
First-person shooter multiplayer online games
First-person shooters
Linux games
Multiplayer online games
Multiplayer video games
Nintendo Switch games
Organized crime video games
PlayStation 5 games
Stealth video games
Video game sequels
Video games developed in Sweden
Video games set in New York City
Windows games
Xbox Series X and Series S games
Unreal Engine games
Plaion